is a 1999 Japanese horror film, directed by Teruo Ishii.

Plot 
Two young girls get a chance to see what it would it be like to be in Hell and while on this tour of Damnation they see the story of what happens to a man who escaped punishment from the court when he raped and murdered several little girls.

Then their own story unfolds before their very eyes. The story of an insane cult in which the blind leader demands tribute from the women and plan mass murder in the belief that the world will be ending soon and they need to help it along.

Cast
 Mutsumi Fujita as Akiko
 Hisayoshi Hirayama as Tsutomu Miyajima
 Michiko Maeda as Enma Daiô
 Yôko Satomi	as Miyako Tazawa
 Kenpachirô Satsuma as Ao oni (Blue Ogre)
 Kinako Satô	as Rika (as Miki Satô)
 Ryûji Takasaki as Aka oni (Red Ogre)
 Tetsurô Tanba as Asu Shino
 Toshimichi Tasaki
 Masato Tsujioka	
 Chiho Yoshida as Satomi

References

External links
 

1999 horror films
1999 films
Japanese horror fiction
Remakes of Japanese films
Films set in hell
1990s Japanese films